Yvonne Yao is a Taiwanese actress.

Filmography

Film

Television series

References

External links

 
 
 

1981 births
21st-century Taiwanese actresses
Living people
Actresses from Taipei